is a Japanese manga series by Auri Hirao. It has been serialized in Tokuma Shoten's seinen manga magazine Monthly Comic Ryū since June 2015. An anime television series adaptation by Eight Bit aired from January to March 2020. A television drama adaptation aired from October to December 2022.

Plot
Eripiyo is initially a woman leading a normal life until it is turned upside down after watching a performance of the minor idol group ChamJam, which leads her to becoming obsessed with one of its members, Maina Ichii. Despite Eripiyo's enthusiasm towards her, Maina is consistently the least popular member of the group, leaving Eripiyo to take it upon herself to buy a lot of Maina's merchandise, which mainly involves singles. Due to her using almost all of her money to buy this merchandise, Eripiyo has only a single tracksuit she wears all the time. She frequently goes to ChamJam's concerts with her friends and fellow ChamJam fans: Kumasa, whose favorite is Reo Igarashi, and Motoi, who prefers Sorane Matsuyama. Eripiyo continues to work several part-time jobs to support Maina, and Maina herself increasingly becomes concerned that Eripiyo is pushing herself too hard for her.

Characters

Main characters

A normal girl who regularly wears a jersey. She becomes interested in idols after catching a performance of the local idol group ChamJam, becoming fond of its member Maina. She often works part-time jobs to pay for her merchandise, to the point of frequently overworking and falling sick.

ChamJam

Media

Manga
If My Favorite Pop Idol Made It to the Budokan, I Would Die is written and illustrated by Auri Hirao. It began serialization in Tokuma Shoten's seinen manga magazine Monthly Comic Ryū in the August 2015 issue, which was released on June 19, 2015. Nine volumes have been released as of September 2022. In North America, the manga is licensed by Tokyopop.

Volume list

Anime
An anime adaptation was announced in the July issue of Monthly Comic Ryū magazine on May 18, 2018. The series was animated by Eight Bit and directed by Yusuke Yamamoto, with Deko Akao handling the series' composition, Tomoyuki Shitaya and Masaru Yonezawa designing the characters, and Moe Hyūga composing the music. It aired from January 10 to March 27, 2020 on TBS and BS-TBS. The opening theme song "Clover wish" is by idol group ChamJam, while the ending theme song is a cover of Aya Matsuura's "Momoiro Kataomoi" by Fairouz Ai as Eripiyo. The series ran for 12 episodes. Funimation licensed the series for a SimulDub.

Episode list

TV drama
In the seventh volume of the series, a live-action adaptation was announced. It was later revealed to be a television drama, starring Sayuri Matsumura as Eripiyo. The series was directed by Kentarō Ōtani, Hitomi Kitagawa and Akihiko Takaishi, based on a screenplay by Kumiko Motoyama, and the music was composed by Moe Hyūga. It aired on ABC and TV Asahi from October 9 to December 25, 2022.

Notes

References

External links
Oshi ga Budōkan Ittekuretara Shinu at Monthly Comic Ryū 
 
 

2020 anime television series debuts
2022 Japanese television series debuts
Anime series based on manga
Comedy anime and manga
Crunchyroll anime
Eight Bit (studio)
Japanese idols in anime and manga
Manga adapted into television series
Seinen manga
TBS Television (Japan) original programming
Tokuma Shoten manga
Tokyopop titles
TV Asahi television dramas